Anthony Kavanagh (born September 26, 1969) is a Canadian stand up comedian, actor, singer and TV presenter. After a successful career on the francophone stand-up scene in Quebec, he became a major star in France and is now a popular television host.

Early life 
Anthony Kavanagh was born to Haitian parents on September 26, 1969. He made his stage début in a high school talent show at the age of 14. In 1989, he won the Best New Comic Award of the Juste pour rire Festival ("Just for Laughs") in Montreal. This award propelled him onto the Quebec show business scene. Kavanagh charmed English and French speaking audiences alike.
In 1992, Kavanagh opened for touring artists such as Julio Iglesias and Natalie Cole and spent two years as Céline Dion's opening act across Canada, in French and in English.
Kavanagh got his own television talk show in 1993 "…et Anthony", becoming the youngest talk show host in Quebec at age 23. He co-starred on the  French Canadian comedy radio show Les Midis fous on CKOI (No.1 in their time slot), then in a recurring role on the television series Super sans plomb  and a starring role in the made-for-TV movie "Voodoo Taxi"  for Canadian Broadcasting Corporation (CBC).

Career

Stand-up comedy 
Kavanagh presented his first stand-up comedy show, "Kavanagh!" across Quebec in 1995. The one-man show was a success and garnered rave reviews. That same year, he received the Outstanding New Talent award at the Montreux Comedy Festival in Switzerland. In December, Kavanagh once again opened for Celine Dion in Paris at the Paris-Bercy and Zenith arenas.

In 1998, after taking a year to adapt and prepare his show "Kavanagh!"  for France with famous French comedian Pascal Légitimus, Kavanagh debuted in Lyon right in the middle of the  FIFA World Cup. Nevertheless, the show drew sold-out crowds, even turning away more than 150 people a day. In the fall, he took up residence at Theâtre Trévise in Paris for seven months to sold-out audiences. After less than one year in France, Kavanagh was asked to do four shows at the Olympia, the most prestigious theater in France. After 5 years, in 2003, his Kavanagh! Tour ended after 500 shows in 7 countries and 250,000 DVDs sold.

In 2008, after a five-year break from stand-up comedy, Kavanagh returned to the comedy stage with a new one-man show "Anthonykavanagh.com" touring in Canada, France and Switzerland. The following year, he returned to Théâtre du Gymnase with another new comedy show called "Ouate Else". Kavanagh took this show on tour across France and Switzerland in 2010.

Every year, since 2010, Kavanagh has hosted the "Grand Gala at the Festival Grand Rire de Québec" , a Quebec comedy festival which airs on Radio-Canada.

Acting career 

Following in the footsteps of Richard Gere on film and Usher on Broadway, Kavanagh was chosen in 2003 to play lawyer Billy Flynn in the French version of the musical comedy Chicago in Montreal and Paris.

In 1998, Kavanagh voiced the character Mushu for the French-Canadian dub of the Disney animated film Mulan. He also provided voice work in French for Home on the Range (2004) by Disney : Buck (French voice); Madagascar 1 (2005), 2 (2008) & 3 (2012) by DreamWorks: Marty the zebra (French and French Canadian voice);  Happy Feet 1 (2006) and 2 (2011) by Warner Bros: Memphis and Lovelace (French voice); The Princess and the Frog by Disney (2010): Ray (French and French Canadian voice).
 
In 2006, Kavanagh launched the show "Les démons de l'Arkange" accompanied by the album by the same name. The show was a musical, a concert, and standup comedy show all rolled into one. The show debuted at the Grand Rex in Paris, and then moved to Théâtre des Variétés.

French filmmaker Étienne Chatiliez gave him the leading male role in his 2008 film "Agathe Clery" in which he played Quentin Lambert, a French businessman.

Kavanagh played American GI Gary Larochelle in the Philippe Niang made-for-TV movie "Les amants de l'ombre" in 2009. It was a huge hit, attracting over four million viewers.

Kavanagh took a supporting role in the mini-series "La Fille au Fond du Verre à Saké" by Emmanuel Sapolsky which aired on Canal Plus in 2009, playing a gay French Canadian car designer living in Paris.

This year for the new season of "Fais pas ci, fais pas ça", (French hit TV series), Kavanagh guest starred as the new neighbour, sports agent Chris Lenoir.

Television 
Since 2001, TF1, the biggest television network in Europe and the most popular in France, has invited him to MC the "NRJ Music Awards"  (equivalent to the MTV Music Awards) six years in a row welcoming major French and international stars like David Guetta, Beyoncé, Jay-Z, Britney Spears, U2, Black Eyed Peas, Usher, Coldplay, Madonna.Kavanagh's charisma, outstanding presence, and combined North American and French culture helped make this show a must-see annual showcase to this day.

In 2006, Kavanagh hosted numerous primetime French TV shows on France 2 television network – "The Dancing Show", "Fête de la Musique" and the "Symphonic Show" and the renowned «Night of Proms» orchestra.

Kavanagh also returned to television in 2010 as host of a show he co-wrote and co-produced called "Nous avons les images", broadcast on Comédie Channel in France and Super Écran in Canada.

In late 2014 he became a contestant on the fifth season of TF1's Danse avec les Stars.

Various Shows 
 2010 : Anthony Kavanagh fait son coming out
 2009 : Ouate Else
 2008 : Anthonykavanagh.com
 2006 : Les Démons de L'Arkange
 2003 : Chicago, the musical - Billy Flynn
 1995-99 : Kavanagh !

Filmography 
 2021 : Fatherhood - ER doctor
 2019 : Aladdin : Genie (French and Quebec voice)
 2016 : Moana : Maui (French and Quebec voice)
 2010 : The Princess and the Frog : Ray (French and Quebec voices)
 2008 : Agathe Cléry - Quentin Lambert
 2008 : Madagascar 2 - Marty le zèbre (French voice)
 2005 : Madagascar - Marty le zèbre (French voice)
 2004 : Home on the Range - Buck (French voice)
 2000 : Antilles sur Seine
 1998 : Mulan - Mushu (Quebec voice)

Television

Movies 
 2011 : Fais pas ci, fais pas ça - Chris Lenoir
 2011 : Oggy et les cafards (voices)
 2009 : Les Amants de l'ombre - Gary Larochelle
 2008 : La Fille au fond du verre à saké - Maxime Leroy
 2005 : Le cœur a ses raisons - Brock Steel
 1989 - 1991 : Super sans plomb
 1991 : Voodoo Taxi

Shows 
 2010 : Nous avons les images on Comédie channel !
 2006 : Shymphonic Show on France 2.
 2006 : Dancing Show on France 2.
 2001 à 2006 : NRJ Music Award

Radio 
 1994 : Midis Fous de CKOI, on CKOI-FM

Video games
 2011 : Skylanders: Spyro's Adventure - Kaos (Quebec French)
 2012 : Skylanders: Giants - Kaos (Quebec French)

See also 
 List of Quebec comedians
 Culture of Quebec

External links

 Official website of Anthony Kavanagh

1969 births
Living people
Haitian Quebecers
Canadian male soap opera actors
Canadian male voice actors
Comedians from Quebec
People from Longueuil
Male actors from Quebec
Participants in French reality television series
Canadian expatriates in France
Black Canadian male actors
Black Canadian comedians
Canadian stand-up comedians
Canadian male comedians